Giraffa stillei is an extinct species of giraffe endemic to Africa during the Pliocene to Pleistocene periods. It had a range from Malawi to Central Africa.

References
Giraffa stillei, Fossilworks

Pliocene even-toed ungulates
Pleistocene even-toed ungulates
Pliocene mammals of Africa
Prehistoric giraffes